
This is a list of aircraft in alphabetical order beginning with 'Te'.

Te

Team Mini-Max 
Team Mini-Max 1030F MAX 103
Team Mini-Max 1100F Mini-MAX
Team Mini-Max 1100R Mini-MAX
Team Mini-Max 1500R Sport
Team Mini-Max 1600R Sport
Team Mini-Max 1550V V-MAX
Team Mini-Max 1650R EROS
Team Mini-Max 1700R Hi-MAX
Team Mini-Max AeroMax

Team Rocket 
(Team Rocket of Texas)
 Team Rocket F1 Rocket
 Team Rocket F2 Rocket

Team Tango 
(Williston, FL)
 Team Tango Foxtrot 4
 Team Tango Tango 2

Tech Aero
(Glisolles, France)
Tech Aero TR 200

TechHaus
(Lady GaGa art house)
 TechHaus Volantis

Technic'air
(Belvès, France)

Technic'air Strato Light
Technic'air Strato Micro
Technic'air Fly Roller
Technic'air Fly Roller Light
Technic'air Flyroller Magnum Biplace

Technoavia 
 Technoavia SM92 Finist
 Technoavia Rysachok
 Technoavia SP-91 Slava
 Technoavia SM-94
 Technoavia SP-95
 Technoavia SM-2000P

Technoflug 
 Technoflug Piccolo
 Technoflug TKF-2 Carat

TechProAviation 
(Olomouc, Czech Republic)
TechProAviation Merlin 100

Tecma Sport
(La Roche-sur-Foron, France and more recently Saint-Pierre-en-Faucigny)
Tecma Boomerang
Tecma Colt
Tecma F1
Tecma F1 Evolution
Tecma F1 Tempo
Tecma FX
Tecma Ixbo
Tecma Mambo
Tecma Medil
Tecma Medium
Tecma Mirage
Tecma Nimbus
Tecma Nuage
Tecma Spirale
Tecma Sport
Tecma T2
Tecma U2

Tecnam 
(Construzione Aeronautiche Tecnam)
 Tecnam P92
 Tecnam P96 Golf
 Tecnam P2002
 Tecnam P2004
 Tecnam P2006T
 Tecnam P2008
 Tecnam P2010
 Tecnam P2012 Traveller
 Tecnam Astore
 Tecnam MMA
 Tecnam P-Jet
 Tecnam P-Mentor
 Tecnam Snap

Tefft 
(Leon Tefft, Chicago, IL)
 Tefft Contester A-1

Tellier Brothers 
(Société Alphonse Tellier et Cie à Neuilly)
 Tellier 1909 (T.1)
 Tellier 200hp Hispano-Suiza
 Tellier 200hp Cannon
 Tellier 350hp Sunbeam (T.4)
 Tellier 2x 250hp Hispano-Suiza (T.5)
 Tellier 1100hp Lorraine
 Tellier T.1
 Tellier T.2
 Tellier T.3
 Tellier T.4
 Tellier T.5
 Tellier T.6
 Tellier T.7
 Tellier T.8
 Tellier T.c.6
 Tellier 1918 4-engined flying boat (Vonna)
 Tellier-Nieuport S

Teman Aircraft 
Teman BiFly
Teman Mono-Fly
Teman SuperFly

Temco Aircraft 
(Texas Engineering & Mfg Co Inc (Fdr: Robert McCulloch, H L Howard), Dallas, TX)
 Temco 24
 Temco 33 Plebe
 Temco 51
 Temco 58
 Temco D-16
 Temco GC-1B Swift
 Temco TE-1 Buckaroo
 Temco T-35 Buckaroo
 Temco TT-1 Pinto
 Temco D-16 (Twin Navion)
 Temco Riley 55

Tennessee Propellers 
(Normandy, TN)
Tennessee Propellers Scout

Teradako-ken 
 Teradako-ken TK-3

Teratorn 
(Teratorn Aircraft, Inc., Clear Lake, IA)
 Teratorn Aircraft Teratorn
 Teratorn T/A
 Teratorn Tierra
 Teratorn Tierra II

Tereshchyenko 
(Fedor Fedorovich Tereshchyenko)
 Tereshchyenko 1909 monoplane
 Tereshchyenko Zembinsky monoplanes
 Tereshchyenko No. 5
 Tereshchyenko No. 5bis
 Tereshchyenko No. 6
 Tereshchyenko No. 7

Terle 
(Joseph Terle, Long Island, NY)
 Terle Sportplane

Termite 
(Termite Aircraft (Fdr: Wilbur L Smith), Bloomington, IL)
 Termite 1957 monoplane

Terrafugia 
(Terrafugia (Pres: Carl Dietrich), Woburn, MA)
 Terrafugia Transition
 Terrafugia TF-X

Terrell & Larson 
(E E Terrell & B Larsen, 3145 Cuthbert St, Oakland, CA)
 Terrell & Larson 1929 Biplane

Terrier 
(Airworthy Airplane Co, Chicago, IL)
 Terrier 1928 Monoplane

Terril 
(Howard L Terril, Torrance, CA)
 Terril Poopsi-Doll HLT-100
 Terril Shushonik
 Terril Special HLT-101

Teruo Kago
(Teruo Kago)
 Teruo Kago TK-1

Tervamäki 
(Jukka Tervamäki)
 Tervamäki JT-1
 Tervamäki JT-2
 Tervamäki-Eerola ATE-3
 Tervamäki JT-5

Terzi Aerodyne 
 Terzi T-9 Stiletto
 Terzi T30 Katana

Tesori 
(Robert Tesori)
 Tesori Scale Reggiane

Tessier 
(Rene Tessier)
 Tessier Biplane

TeST 
(TeST sro (Division of Comp-Let sro), Velké Meziříĉi)
 TeST TST-1 Alpin
 TeST TST-3 Alpin T
 TeST TST-5 Variant
 TeST TST-6 Duo
 TeST TST-7 Junior
 Test TST-8DM Alpin
 TeST TST-9 Junior
 TeST TST-10 Atlas
 TeST TST-12
 TeST TST-13 Junior
 TeST TST-14 Bonus
 TeST TST-14J BonusJet

Teston 
(Georgia)
 Teston Low-Wing

Texas 
(Texas A&M College Aircraft Research Center. / Fred E. Weick)
 Texas Ag-1
 Texas Ag-2
 Texas Ag-3

Texas 
 Williams Texas-Temple Sportsman

Texas Aircraft Manufacturing
(Hondo, Texas)
Texas Aircraft Colt
Texas Aircraft eColt

Texas Helicopter 
(Texas Helicopter Corporation )
 Texas Helicopter M74 Wasp
 Texas Helicopter M74A
 Texas Helicopter M79S Wasp II
 Texas Helicopter M79T Jet Wasp II

References

Further reading

External links 

 List of aircraft (T)